The third season of The Bachelor New Zealand premiered on March 19, 2017. This season stars Zac Franich, a 28 year old lifeguard and sprint kayaker from the Hibiscus Coast, courting 22 women.

Contestants
The season began with 19 contestants. In Episode 7, three "intruders" were brought into the competition, bringing the total number of contestants to 22.

Call-out order

 The contestant received the white rose.
 The contestant received a rose during a date.
 The contestant was eliminated.
 The contestant was eliminated during the date
 This contestant received a rose outside of a date or the rose ceremony
 The contestant quit the competition.
 The contestant was eliminated outside the rose ceremony.
 The contestant won the competition.

Episodes

Notes

References

2017 New Zealand television seasons
New Zealand 03
Television shows filmed in New Zealand